Michal Zrihen (born 23 May 1995) is an Israeli-Portuguese taekwondo athlete. She naturalized Portuguese in 2022 due to Sephardi ancestry after leaving Israel in 2021 to live and train in Spain.

References 

Living people
1995 births
Israeli female taekwondo practitioners
Portuguese female taekwondo practitioners
Portuguese people of Israeli descent
Naturalised citizens of Portugal
21st-century Israeli women
21st-century Portuguese women